Justine Augier (born 1978) is a French writer, laureate of the 2011 edition of the Prix Fénéon with her novel En règle avec la nuit.

Selected works 
2008: Son absence, Paris, Stock 169 p. 
2010: En règle avec la nuit, Stock, 210 p. 
 - Prix Fénéon 2011
2013: Jérusalem, Arles, Actes Sud, series "Un Endroit où aller", 164 p. 
2014: La Vie étonnante d’Ellis Spencer, Arles, Actes Sud, series "Ado : aventure", 141 p. 
2015: Les Idées noires, Arles, Actes Sud, series "Littérature française", 256 p. 
2017: De l'Ardeur, Arles, Actes Sud, séries "Littérature française, 320 p.

References 

21st-century French novelists
Prix Fénéon winners
1978 births
Living people
21st-century French women writers
Prix Renaudot de l'essai winners